The Colombia Always (Colombia Siempre) is a national conservative party in Colombia. 
At the legislative elections held on 10 March 2002, the party won, as one of the many small parties, parliamentary representation. Germán Vargas Lleras and Nancy Patricia Gutiérrez each won a seat in the Senate under this party.

Conservative parties in Colombia